Monghpyak District (also Mong Hpyak or Mongphyat) is a district of the Shan State in Myanmar. It consists 2 townships and 554 villages.

Townships
The district contains the following townships:
Mong Hpayak Township
Mong Yawng Township

Districts of Myanmar
Geography of Shan State